Parliamentary elections were held in Kyrgyzstan on 20 February 2000, with a second round on 12 March. The Union of Democratic Forces, an alliance of Asaba, the Party of Economic Revival, the Social Democratic Party and the Unity Party, emerged as the largest bloc in Parliament, with 12 of the 105 seats. Voter turnout was 64.4%.

Results

References

Kyrgyzstan
Elections in Kyrgyzstan
2000 in Kyrgyzstan
Election and referendum articles with incomplete results